Aee Soe (born 15 November 1996) is a Burmese professional footballer who plays as striker for Young Elephants.in Lao League 1  and Myanmar national team. Aee Soe has been dubbed the "Neymar of Myanmar" by FOX Sports Asia in one of their videos due to their striking resemblance.

Club career

Early year
In 2015, Aee Soe played in Manaw Myay Youth team and showed individual skill. Aee Soe was chosen for Manaw Myay Senior Team in 2016. But Manaw Myay FC quit from 2016 MNL season. And then, Yangon United Coaches called him to Yangon United Youth Team. In 2017, he was called for Myanmar U21 to play 2017 International U-21 Thanh Niên Newspaper Cup. In the competition, he made his best performance and scored two goals.

Yangon United
In 2018, Yangon United chose Aee Soe for 2018 Myanmar National League squad list. January 28, Aee Soe played his first professional match against Sagaing United F.C. at Away. Aee Soe scored his first professional goal against GFA and his first international goal won 2-1 against FLC Thanh Hóa.

Young Elephants FC
In 2022 May, Aee Soe cancelled the contract with Yangon United and transferred to Young Elephants.

Honours

Young Elephants
Lao Premier League: 2022
Lao FF Cup: 2022

References

1996 births
Living people
People from Myitkyina
Burmese footballers
Myanmar international footballers
Yangon United F.C. players
Association football midfielders